Stinking corpse may refer to:

 The Stinking Corpse: Aztec myth about a giant which released a stench that would kill anyone who smelled it when he was killed by the Toltecs.
 Stinking Corpse Flower: Rafflesia, genus of parasitic flowering plants which includes the [Stinking Corpse Lily] (Rafflesia arnoldii)

See also 
 Amorphophallus titanium, also known as the corpse flower or corpse plant due to its stinking carcass smell.